Lisičji Kamen (also known as Guri i Dhelprës in Albanian) is a mountain in Kosovo,  in the Šar Mountains in Gora next to North Macedonia and Albania.
The nearest peaks are Ovčinec, the next town is Brod (Prizren), the next biggest lake is Šutmansko Lake. It is one of the higher peaks in Kosovo .

Notes and references

Notes:

References:

Mountains of Kosovo
Šar Mountains
Two-thousanders of Kosovo